Rogério Bernardes (born 25 March 1964) is a Portuguese bobsledder. He competed in the four man event at the 1988 Winter Olympics.

References

1964 births
Living people
Portuguese male bobsledders
Olympic bobsledders of Portugal
Bobsledders at the 1988 Winter Olympics
Place of birth missing (living people)